Enchelybrotula is a genus of deep-water cusk-eels.

Species
There are currently two recognized species in this genus:
 Enchelybrotula gomoni Cohen, 1982
 Enchelybrotula paucidens H. M. Smith & Radcliffe, 1913

References

Ophidiidae